Minnedosa was a provincial electoral division in the Canadian province of Manitoba from 1881 to 2011. It was created in 1881 with the expansion of the province's western boundary.  From 1886 to 1888, it was divided into two ridings, Minnedosa East and Minnedosa West.

Minnedosa was located in the southwestern region of Manitoba. It was bordered by Russell to the north, Ste. Rose to the east, Turtle Mountain to the east and south, and Arthur-Virden to the south and west. The constituency also surrounded the City of Brandon, which is divided into the ridings of Brandon East and Brandon West.

Minnedosa itself was the largest community in the constituency. Other communities in riding the included Souris, Rivers, Rapid City, Shilo, Basswood, Wawanesa, and Erickson.

Minnedosa's population in 1996 was 18,694. In 1999, the average family income was $46,627, and the unemployment rate was 3.50%. Agriculture accounted for 22% of the riding's industry, followed by government services at 12% and health and social services at 12%. Six per cent of the population was of German background, and 15% were over 65 years of age.

Minnedosa was held by the Progressive Conservative Party for several decades, but the New Democratic Party made efforts to win the seat in the riding's last years. In the provincial election of 2003, the Conservative Party retained the seat by only 12 votes, but in the 2007 Election the Progressive Conservative incumbent Leanne Rowat won with 52.83% and the NDP candidate won 38.53% of the vote.

As a result of the 2008 Electoral Redistibution, for the 2011 Election, the constituency was dissolved. Most of the riding, including the city of Minnedosa, became part of the new riding of Riding Mountain. Smaller portions were transferred to the new ridings of Spruce Woods and Arthur-Virden.

List of provincial representatives (Minnedosa, original constituency)

List of provincial representatives (Minnedosa East)

List of provincial representatives (Minnedosa West)

List of provincial representatives (Minnedosa, re-established)

Election results

1881 by-election

1883 general election

1888 general election

1892 general election

1896 general election

1899 general election

1903 general election

1907 general election

1910 general election

1914 general election

1915 general election

1917 by-election

1920 general election

1922 general election

1927 general election

1932 general election

1936 general election

1941 general election

1945 general election

1948 by-election

1949 general election

1953 general election

1958 general election

1959 general election

1962 general election

1966 general election

1969 general election

1971 by-election

1973 general election

1977 general election

1981 general election

1986 general election

1988 general election

1990 general election

1995 general election

1999 general election

2003 general election

2007 general election

References

Former provincial electoral districts of Manitoba